Torsten Rudenschöld (30 March 1798 – 27 May 1859) was a Swedish educator and social reformer.

References

 

1798 births
1859 deaths
Swedish educators
Social reformers
Burials at Uppsala old cemetery